Lökbatan Olympic Sport Complex Stadium, is a multi-use stadium in Lökbatan settlement of Baku, Azerbaijan. It is the home stadium of Qaradağ Lökbatan FK.  The stadium holds 2,500 people and opened in 2007.

References

See also
List of football stadiums in Azerbaijan

Football venues in Azerbaijan
Sports venues in Baku